Ghost Song may refer to:
Ghost Song (video game), 2022
"Ghost Song", by Air from The Virgin Suicides
"The Ghost Song", by the Doors from An American Prayer
"The Ghost Song", by Calvert & West

See also
Ghost Songs, one half of the 2005 Tim Rogers and the Temperance Union double album Dirty Ron/Ghost Songs